Protein BTG4 also known as BTG family member 4 is a protein that in humans is encoded by the BTG4 gene (B-cell translocation gene 4).  BTG4 has anti-proliferative properties and can induce G1 cell cycle arrest.

References

External links

Further reading